Kuare Rural LLG is a local-level government (LLG) of Southern Highlands Province, Papua New Guinea.

Wards
01. Epapini
02. Ita
03. Kalawida
04. Kaporoi
05. Karanda 1
06. Karanda 2
07. Karavere
08. Kilipini 1
09. Kola
10. Kuwi
11. Lapoko
12. Tindane/Kolopi
13. Tulupari
14. Agu Limba
15. Mapiro 1
16. Mapiro 2
17. Kupia

References

Local-level governments of Southern Highlands Province